Now That's What I Call Party Hits! is a compilation album released on November 13, 2007. The album was certified Gold by the RIAA in March 2008.

Track listing

See also
 Now That's What I Call Club Hits

References
 Allmusic - Now That's What I Call Party Hits
 Robert Christgau - Consumer Guide Album

2007 compilation albums
Party Hits